Keto diet may refer to:

 A low-carbohydrate, high-fat diet mainly used for weight loss in adults
 Ketogenic diet, a special diet for treating epilepsy, mostly in children